Hemlock is a hamlet and census-designated place (CDP) in the town of Livonia, Livingston County, New York, United States. The population was 557 as of the 2010 census.

The Hemlock post office has a ZIP Code of 14466 and serves the southeast part of the town of Livonia as well as parts of the towns of Richmond and Canadice in Ontario County.

Geography
The Hemlock CDP is in eastern Livingston County. U.S. Route 20A passes through the hamlet, leading north and then west  to Livonia village, and east the same distance to Honeoye. New York State Route 15A joins US 20A in Hemlock, running north out of the hamlet with it but leading north  to Lima. To the south NY 15A leads  to Springwater.

The CDP extends south to include the hamlet of Glenville, near the north end of Hemlock Lake, one of the Finger Lakes of New York.

Hemlock Outlet, flowing north from Hemlock Lake, passes through the center of the CDP and leads northeast to Honeoye Creek, part of the Genesee River watershed.

The Hemlock Fairground is on the western side of the hamlet and is the site of the Hemlock "Little World's" Fair. The fairground buildings and racetrack were added to the National Register of Historic Places in 2000.

Demographics

Climate
Hemlock has a humid continental climate (Köppen Dfb).

References

Hamlets in Livingston County, New York
Hamlets in New York (state)
Census-designated places in Livingston County, New York
Census-designated places in New York (state)